Polyphage are genomic multimers of bacteriophage in which multiple viral particles are all encapsulated, one after the other, within the same set of coat proteins.  This phenomenon is characteristic of filamentous phage.

References

Bacteriophages